A Perfect Day is a split EP by Sonic Youth's Lee Ranaldo and the German experimental rock band Something to Burn.

Track listing 

"Instrumental #2 (Something to Burn)" – 3:10
"Deva, Spain: Fragments" – 2:12
"A Perfect Day..." – 2:08
"For Mr. Chapman" -5:59

References 
Info about EP link

Lee Ranaldo albums
1992 EPs